Hussain Al-Nattar (born 14 March 2000) is a Saudi Arabian professional footballer who plays as a midfielder for Al-Adalah on loan from Al-Qadsiah.

Career
Al-Nattar began his career at the youth teams of hometown club Al-Muheet. On 21 December 2015, Al-Nattar joined the youth team of Al-Ettifaq. On 5 October 2019, Al-Nattar joined rival club Al-Qadsiah. He made three appearances during the 2019–20 season as Al-Qadsiah finished in second to earn promotion to the Pro League. On 14 January 2021, Al-Nattar made his Pro League debut in a 2–2 draw against Al-Faisaly. He made 13 appearances during the 2020–21 season as Al-Qadsiah were relegated at the end of the season. On 9 August 2022, Al-Nattar joined Al-Adalah on loan until the end of the 2022–23 season. He made his debut for Al-Adalah on 7 October 2022 in the 2–1 win against Al-Fayha.

Honours
Al-Qadsiah
 First Division runner-up: 2019–20

References

External links 
 

2000 births
Living people
People from Qatif
Saudi Arabian footballers
Saudi Arabia youth international footballers
Al-Muheet SC players
Ettifaq FC players
Al-Qadsiah FC players
Al-Adalah FC players
Saudi First Division League players
Saudi Professional League players
Association football midfielders